The W. M. Keck Foundation is an American charitable foundation supporting scientific, engineering, and medical research in the United States. It was founded in 1954 by William Myron Keck, founder and president of Superior Oil Company (now part of ExxonMobil). The Foundation's net assets exceeded $1.3 billion at the end of 2019.

Overview

From its founding until his death in 1964, the Foundation was led by William Myron Keck. From 1964 to 1995, it was led by W. M. Keck's son, Howard B. Keck. Robert Addison Day, W. M. Keck's grandson has been chairman and president since 1996.

The Foundation provides grants in five broad areas: science and engineering research, undergraduate science and engineering, medical research, liberal arts, in Southern California. Some of the more notable projects that have received funding from the Keck Foundation include:
 2017: The Keck Center for Science and Engineering, at Chapman University,  $21 million
 The W. M. Keck Center for Language Study at Colgate University
 The Keck Center for International and Strategic Studies of Claremont McKenna College (the alma mater of Robert Addison Day, William Myron Keck's grandson, and chairman and president of W. M. Keck Foundation)
 The W.M. Keck Science Department of Claremont McKenna College, Pitzer College, and Scripps College.
 The W.M. Keck Center for Interdisciplinary Bioscience Training at Rice University in Houston, Texas (training arm of the Gulf Coast Consortia (GCC))
 Support for building of the Keck Observatory at Pacific Lutheran University in Tacoma, Washington
 1985, 1991: Construction of the W. M. Keck Observatory at Mauna Kea Observatory in Hawaii, Keck I, Keck II, about $70 million for each
 Keck Institute for Space Studies, established in 2008, a joint institute of the California Institute of Technology and the Jet Propulsion Laboratory
 1999: Expansion of the Keck School of Medicine at the University of Southern California in Los Angeles, California, $110 million
 The W.M. Keck Building Center for fMRI & the W.M. Keck Foundation Center for Ocean-Atmosphere Research at the University of California, San Diego
 Creation of the Keck Graduate Institute of Applied Life Sciences in Claremont, California
 Sponsor of the Keck Computer Science Lab at Loyola Marymount University in Los Angeles, California
 The W.M. Keck Center for Accelerator Mass Spectrometry at University of California, Irvine
 The WM Keck Center for 3D Innovation at University of Texas at El Paso
 The William M. Keck Building at the California Institute of Technology
 The Peter G. Peterson Institute for International Economics in Washington D.C.
The Keck Science Center at Pepperdine University
 The Keck Array, part of the BICEP experiment (Background Imaging of Cosmic Extragalactic Polarization) at the South Pole observatory. 
 W.M.Keck Earth Science and Metal Engineering Museum at the Mackay School of Earth Sciences and Engineering, whose renovation the foundation funded, at the University of Nevada, Reno
The Keck Foundation has been a long-time supporter of public television in Southern California, including underwriting the broadcast of Sesame Street on KCET since the 1970s.

Funding
The foundation has a maximum grant of $5 million, though funding is typically $2 million or less.

The W. M. Keck foundation has these requirements for funding:
 Research that is high impact and that questions or challenges the prevailing paradigm
 Research projects that no one else is pursuing
 A new research project that is in its early stages
 Basic research, not translational or clinical research
Research that would result in general information and new methodologies that can be of benefit to the field, even if the project were to go awry
Research projects that are not funded by any other foundation, and research projects that could not move along without Keck funding
Though this is not a requirement, the W.M. Keck Foundation prefers projects that involve some kind of collaboration over single investigator research

See also 
 Robert Addison Day - current chairman and president (also a grandson of William Myron Keck)
 List of wealthiest charitable foundations

References

External links 
 
 The Keck Center for International and Strategic Studies at Claremont McKenna College
 The W.M. Keck Center for Interdisciplinary Bioscience Training

Keck, W. M., Foundation
Organizations established in 1954
Charities based in California